Mohanlalganj is a tehsil and community development block in Lucknow district, Uttar Pradesh, India. It has historically constituted part of the village of Mau.

History 
The eponymous market, called Mohanlalganj, was established in 1859 by Raja Kashi Parshad and named after his father-in-law, Mohan Lal, from whom he had received his estate. Kashi Parshad had spent 50,000 rupees to finance its construction, and later additions costing a further 30,000 rupees were made, including drains and masonry verandas. At the turn of the 20th century, the Mohanlalganj bazaar was described as an important commercial center, mainly for grain and cloth, and its entrances were marked by two grand archways. Kashi Parshad also built a 250-foot-tall temple for one lakh (100,000) rupees; the temple was built from brick and given a veneer of marble and black stone.

Mohanlalganj historically was the seat of a pargana, having succeeded Amethi in this capacity.

Villages 
Mohanlalganj block comprises the following 113 villages:

References 

Lucknow district